Elaine Shirley Watt (December 1, 1929 – February 19, 1985) was an American equestrian. She competed in the individual dressage event at the 1956 Summer Olympics.

References

External links
 

1929 births
1985 deaths
American female equestrians
American dressage riders
Olympic equestrians of the United States
Equestrians at the 1956 Summer Olympics
Sportspeople from Brooklyn
20th-century American women